The 1946 USC Trojans football team was an American football team that represented the University of Southern California (USC) in the Pacific Coast Conference (PCC) during the 1946 college football season. In their fifth year under head coach Jeff Cravath, the Trojans compiled a 6–4 record (5–2 against PCC opponents), finished in third place in the PCC, and outscored their opponents by a total of 158 to 106. The Trojans were ranked No. 10 in the AP Poll in mid-November before losing consecutive games against No. 4 UCLA and No. 2 Notre Dame.

Two USC players received first-team honors from the Associated Press (AP) or United Press (UP) on the 1946 All-Pacific Coast football team: tackle John Ferraro (AP-1, UP-1); and guard Mike Garzoni (AP-1).

Schedule

1947 NFL Draft

The 1947 NFL Draft was held on December 16, 1946. The following Trojans were selected.

References

USC
USC Trojans football seasons
USC Trojans football